Pagyda perlustralis is a moth in the family Crambidae. It was described by Rebel in 1915. It is found on Samoa.

References

Moths described in 1915
Pyraustinae